Herfra til evigheten (English: 'From Here to Eternity') was a Norwegian spiritual TV series which was shown on NRK1 in summer 2002, presented by Kjell Erik Moen. In the show, Moen and photographer Jon Anton Brekne travelled around the world, including in Norway, to find Norwegians who are interested in different things in life. 

The series premiered on NRK on 13 January 2002 and was shown on Sundays at 22:30.

In the course of the 8 programmes, Uganda, India, Bolivia, Chicago, Thailand, Mozambique, Oslo and Lista were visited. Mostly, the show dealt with people who had sold their land and property and moved to the other side of the world for ideological reasons. 

The show got good reviews, and was repeated in summer 2002.

External links
Official webpage

NRK original programming
Travel television series
2000s Norwegian television series
2002 Norwegian television series debuts
2002 Norwegian television series endings